The Silver Thread Scenic and Historic Byway is a  National Scenic Byway, National Forest Scenic Byway, and Colorado Scenic and Historic Byway located in Gunnison, Hinsdale, Mineral, and Rio Grande counties, Colorado, USA. The byway explores the historic silver mining region in the high San Juan Mountains of southwestern Colorado. The byway follows Colorado State Highway 149 for its entire length from U.S. Highway 160 in South Fork to U.S. Highway 50 west of Gunnison. The byway crosses the Continental Divide at Spring Creek Pass, elevation , and crests at Slumgullion Summit, elevation . Lake San Cristobal is formed by the Slumgullion Earthflow, a National Natural Landmark.

Route

Attractions

Gallery

See also

History Colorado
List of scenic byways in Colorado
Scenic byways in the United States

Notes

References

External links

America's Byways
America's Scenic Byways: Colorado
Colorado Department of Transportation
Colorado Scenic & Historic Byways Commission
Colorado Scenic & Historic Byways
Colorado Travel Map
Colorado Tourism Office
History Colorado
National Forest Scenic Byways

Colorado Scenic and Historic Byways
National Scenic Byways
National Scenic Byways in Colorado
National Forest Scenic Byways
National Forest Scenic Byways in Colorado
Gunnison National Forest
Rio Grande National Forest
Transportation in Colorado
Transportation in Delta County, Colorado
Transportation in Mesa County, Colorado
Tourist attractions in Colorado
Tourist attractions in Delta County, Colorado
Tourist attractions in Mesa County, Colorado
U.S. Route 50
U.S. Route 160